Anthony Fabrizio (born 1960) is an American Republican pollster and strategist. The principal in Fabrizio, Lee & Associates, Fabrizio was the pollster for Donald Trump's fall 2016 presidential campaign, former Senator Bob Dole's 1996 presidential campaign, U.S. Senator Rand Paul's U.S. Senate and 2016 presidential campaign, and former Governor Rick Perry's 2012 presidential campaign, among others. He also served as a pollster for the U.S. Chamber of Commerce in the 2014 midterm elections.

Fabrizio is a silent owner of Multi Media Services Corporation (MMSC).  MMSC was the biggest vendor to the top pro-Trump Rebuilding America Now super PAC.

In February 2018, he was questioned by Robert Mueller's Special Counsel team about polling data shared with pro-Kremlin pro-Putin individuals.

Career
In 1996, Fabrizio served as chief pollster and strategist to Bob Dole's Presidential campaign, which was unsuccessful. He has also worked for several dozen U.S. Senators and Governors, including Tim Pawlenty, Rand Paul, Bill Cassidy, David Perdue, among others. During 2012 and 2013, he received $250,000 for his efforts to assist Paul Manafort's pro-Russia, pro-Kremlin, pro-Putin efforts in Ukraine. He was also pollster for the Republican Governor Association's campaign to reelect Governor Scott Walker in 2014.  He also served as the pollster for the U.S. Chamber of Commerce's independent campaign effort that helped elect six new Republican Senators and re-elect three Republican incumbents in 2014.

In 2015, he served as pollster for successful gubernatorial candidate Matt Bevin in Kentucky, and that year also aided Rand Paul's Presidential campaign. Following Paul's exit from the race, Fabrizio was hired by the campaign of Donald Trump as Chief Pollster, joining fellow pollsters Kellyanne Conway and John McLaughlin (Fabrizio's former business partner). Fabrizio's hiring as Trump's pollster came as a surprise to political analysts, pointing to Trump's past opposition to pollsters, with Trump stating in an interview with Chuck Todd on Meet the Press, "I don't have pollsters. I don't want to waste money on pollsters. I don't want to be unreal. I want to be me. I have to be me." He and Conway were among those representing the Trump campaign at Harvard University's post-election roundtable. Fabrizio is also longtime friends with former Trump advisers Paul Manafort and Roger Stone.

In October 2016, it was reported in multiple media outlets that Trump was refusing to pay for Fabrizio's polling services, with the Federal Election Commission report showing that Trump's campaign was disputing nearly $767,000 that Fabrizio's firm said it was still owed for polling.

Fabrizio has additionally worked with clients including Visa, Hewlett-Packard, Bank of America, AOL/Time-Warner, FedEx, Pfizer, and Harrah's, among others.

Mueller's Special Counsel investigations
In February 2018, Fabrizio was questioned by Robert Mueller's team to determine if voter information and polling data was shared with the Kremlin during the 2016 United States elections. On January 8, 2019, Paul Manafort's attorneys failed to redact and inadvertently revealed that Mueller's prosecutors knew that 2016 voter information and polling data had been shared with pro-Kremlin Ukrainians through Konstantin Kilimnik to Serhiy Lyovochkin and Rinat Akhmetov.

Personal life
Fabrizio is a Brooklyn native, and grew up on Long Island in New York.

See also
 Timeline of investigations into Donald Trump and Russia

Notes

References

External links
 Fabrizio, Lee & Associate - Official website

1960 births
American political consultants
American political commentators
American people of Italian descent
Donald Trump 2016 presidential campaign
Living people
New York (state) Republicans
People associated with the 2016 United States presidential election
People from Brooklyn
People from Fort Lauderdale, Florida
Pollsters